Abelia species are used as food plants by the caterpillars of the following Lepidoptera species:

Acleris askoldana – recorded on A. spathulata
Biston robustum – recorded on A. spathulata
Ctenoplusia albostriata – recorded on A. grandiflora
Eumeta minuscula – recorded on A. grandiflora
Hemaris thysbe
Heterolocha stulta – recorded on A. spathulata
Microleon longipalpis – recorded on A. grandiflora
Odontopera arida – recorded on A. grandiflora
Phthonosema invenustaria – recorded on A. serrata
Synegia hadassa – recorded on A. spathulata
Wilemania nitobei – recorded on A. spathulata

References

Abelia